The River Stour (rhymes with "tour" or with "sour") is a river in East Anglia, England. It rises in eastern Cambridgeshire, passes to the east of Haverhill, through Cavendish, Bures, Sudbury, Nayland, Stratford St Mary, Dedham and flows through the Dedham Vale Area of Outstanding Natural Beauty. It becomes tidal just before Manningtree in Essex and joins the North Sea at Harwich.

Etymology and usage

The name is of ambiguous and disputed origin.

On one theory, the name Stour derives from the Celtic sturr meaning "strong". However, the river-name Stour, common in England, does not occur at all in Wales; Crawford noted two tributaries of the Po River near Turin, spelled Stura. In Germany the Stoer is a tributary of the River Elbe. According to Brewer's Britain and Ireland the Stour is pronounced differently in different cases: the Kentish and East Anglian Stours rhyme with tour; the Oxfordshire Stour is sometimes rhymes with mower, sometimes with hour, and the Worcestershire Stour always rhymes with hour. Locally, the River Stour dividing Essex from Suffolk does not have a uniform pronunciation, varying from stowr to stoor.

As against that, stour is a Middle English word with two distinct meanings and derivations, still current enough to appear in most substantial dictionaries. As an adjective, with Germanic roots, it signifies "large, powerful" (in present-day Scandinavian languages stor means "big, great"). As a noun, from medieval French roots, it signifies "tumult, commotion; confusion" or an "armed battle or conflict". Wiktionary also adds "blowing or deposit of dust", the primary definition in the Concise Oxford Dictionary, which adds that this is a northern English and Scottish usage of uncertain derivation. In 2006 it has been suggested that an Old European river-name was taken for an Old English adjective and that stour came to represent one pole of a structural opposition, with blyth at the opposite pole, allowing Anglo-Saxons to classify rivers on a continuum of fierceness.

The Victorian etymologist Isaac Taylor, now long discredited on many counts, proposed a very simple solution: that Stour derives from dŵr, the Welsh word for water.

It is quite possible that the various Stours do not share a common origin and that they need to be considered in their own terms rather than as a single problem. Certainly there is currently no universally-accepted explanation.

Description
The river rises in Wratting Common, Cambridgeshire, near to Weston Colville, becoming estuary near Manningtree, running along the southern side of the Shotley Peninsula, and reaches the sea at Harwich. The eastern part of the River Stour is an Area of Outstanding Natural Beauty known as Dedham Vale, named after the village of Dedham in Essex. It is an area of rural beauty on both sides of the river.

The earliest known settlement on the river in Suffolk was at Great Bradley, where man has had a recorded presence for over 5,000 years.

During the Anglo-Saxon era, the river became the boundary between the Kingdom of the East Saxons and the Kingdom of East Anglia. The Life of King Alfred records a naval battle taking place at the mouth of the river in 884, where Alfred the Great defeated a force of 13 Viking ships.

The River Stour was one of the first improved rivers or canals in England. Parliament passed  'An Act for making the River Stower navigable from the town of Manningtree, in the county of Essex, to the town of Sudbury, in the county of Suffolk'  in 1705, mandating public navigation rights and providing the basis of a joint stock company of London and Suffolk investors who raised £4,800 to cut and manage the river.
Although partly supplanted by railways, lighters were still working on the Stour above Manningtree almost until World War II. As of 2016 they still operate as far as Mistley.

The Stour valley has been portrayed as a working river by John Constable, Thomas Gainsborough, Alfred Munnings, John Nash and Cedric Morris. Constable's connection with the area was especially important, evident in such works as The Stour Valley and Dedham Church c. 1815. John Nash settled in the Stour valley and is buried at St Andrew's at Wormingford , one of its typically serene small settlements. 

The River Stour Trust, a waterway restoration group, was set up in 1968 to protect and enhance the right of the public to navigate the River Stour. The trust seeks to restore through navigation from Sudbury to the sea, following on the successful restoration of the locks at Stratford St Mary, Dedham, Flatford and Great Cornard, by reinstating the remaining locks. Meanwhile, the trust encourages use of the River Stour by small craft and organises annual events for all age groups and abilities on different parts of the river. River Stour Trust boat trips and private charters, skippered by volunteer boat crew, are available in Flatford and Sudbury between Easter and October. The Environment Agency is the navigation authority for the river. River Stour Boating Community Interest Company (based in Bures) and Outdoor Hire Centre Network organise two-day canoeing and camping expeditions from Sudbury to the estuary at Cattawade along with other annual events such as Santa Paddle and the Coracle Regatta.  
RSPB Stour Estuary is a nature reserve managed by the Royal Society for the Protection of Birds (RSPB).

In July 2019 sections of the river ran dry because of low rainfall and debris blocking flows at Bures Mill. The Environment Agency pumped water from boreholes into the river in an attempt to restore water levels.

See also
 List of rivers in England
 History of the British canal system

References

External links

 The River Stour Trust
 Stour lighter John Constable Register of National Historic Ships
 Priestley's Navigable Rivers and Canals, 1831 River Stour p. 597
Bures Community Website - gives the full Navigation history of the river from the time of the horse drawn lighters up to the present day

Rivers of Cambridgeshire
Rivers of Essex
Rivers of Suffolk